Austria participated at the 2017 Summer Universiade in Taipei, Taiwan with 41 competitors in 10 sports.

Competitors 
The following table lists Austria's delegation per sport and gender.

Medalists 
The following Austria competitors won medals at the games.

|  style="text-align:left; width:78%; vertical-align:top;"|

|  style="text-align:left; width:22%; vertical-align:top;"|

Athletics

Men

Women

Track Events

Field Events

Combined Events
Heptathlon

Badminton

Fencing

Golf

Gymnastics

Artistic

Team

Individual

Judo

Roller Sports

Swimming

Men

Women

Table Tennis

Tennis

References

Nations at the 2017 Summer Universiade
2017 in Austrian sport